Jamboo Savari is a 2014 Kannada crime comedy film starring Prajwal Devaraj and Nikki Galrani in the lead role. The film is directed by K. C. Venugopal and produced by Hari Prasad Rao under HPR Entertainment Pvt Limited banner. The music for the film is composed by S. Premkumar. It was released on 13 June 2014.

The film is a remake of successful Telugu film Swamy Ra Ra which starred Nikhil Siddharth and Swati Reddy.

Cast
 Prajwal Devaraj as Balu
 Nikki Galrani as Purvi
 Chaitra Rai as Pinky
 Achyuth Kumar as Sethuram 
 Mitra
 Shobharaj

Soundtrack

Release 
Movie was released on 13 June 2014 across Karnataka.

The Times of India gave the film a rating of three out of five stars and stated that "Prajwal steals the show with a livewire performance. Glamorous Chaithra Rai has put life and soul into her character. Music by S Premkumar and camerawork by V Prathap bolster the script and performances".

References

External links

2014 films
2010s Kannada-language films
Kannada remakes of Telugu films
Indian crime comedy films
2010s crime comedy films
2014 comedy films